The Lake of the Woods is a wooded lake located southwest of Bremen, Indiana.

External links
 Town of Bremen, Indiana website

Bodies of water of Marshall County, Indiana
Lakes of Indiana